Liam Cosgrave (13 April 1920 – 4 October 2017) was an Irish Fine Gael politician who served as Taoiseach from 1973 to 1977, Leader of Fine Gael from 1965 to 1977, Leader of the Opposition from 1965 to 1973, Minister for External Affairs from 1954 to 1957, and Parliamentary Secretary to the Minister for Industry and Commerce and Government Chief Whip from 1948 to 1951. He served as a Teachta Dála (TD) from 1943 to 1981.

Born in Castleknock, Dublin, Cosgrave was the son of W. T. Cosgrave, the first President of the Executive Council in the newly formed Irish Free State. After qualifying as a barrister he began a political career. He was elected to Dáil Éireann at the 1943 general election and sat in opposition alongside his father. In the first inter-party government in 1948, Cosgrave was appointed as Parliamentary Secretary to the Taoiseach John A. Costello. He became a cabinet member in 1954 when he was appointed Minister for External Affairs. The highlight of his three-year tenure was Ireland's successful entry into the United Nations. In 1965, Cosgrave was the unanimous choice of his colleagues to succeed James Dillon as leader of Fine Gael. He lost the 1969 general election to the incumbent Taoiseach Jack Lynch, but won the 1973 general election and became Taoiseach in a Fine Gael-Labour Party government.

Early life
Cosgrave displayed a keen interest in politics from an early age, discussing the topic with his father as a teenager before eventually joining Fine Gael at the age of 17, speaking at his first public meeting the same year. He was educated at Synge Street CBS, then later at Castleknock College, Dublin, and later at King's Inns. He studied law and was called to the Irish Bar in 1943.

Political career

Political beginnings

To the surprise of his family, Liam sought election to Dáil Éireann in the 1943 general election and was elected as a TD for Dublin County at the age of 23, sitting in the 11th Dáil alongside his father W. T. Cosgrave who was one of the founders of the Irish Free State in the 1920s. Cosgrave rapidly rose through the ranks of Fine Gael, and was regarded as being by far the most able and active of Fine Gael's newer TDs. His election in 1943 occurred during a long period when his party was in opposition, from 1932 to 1948.

Cosgrave wrote to the Party Leader, Richard Mulcahy, in May 1947, on the poor attendance in the Dáil, and informed his leader that "I cannot any longer conscientiously ask the public to support the party as a party, and in the circumstances I do not propose to speak at meetings outside my constituency." Nevertheless, when the First Inter-Party government was formed after the 1948 general election, Taoiseach John A. Costello nominated Cosgrave for appointment by the government as Parliamentary Secretary to the Taoiseach and Chief Whip and as Parliamentary Secretary to the Minister for Industry and Commerce on 24 February 1948. He served in these positions until the dissolution of the Dáil on 7 May 1951.

Minister
After the 1954 general election, a Second Inter-Party government was formed on 2 June 1954, led again by John A. Costello. Cosgrave, at the age of 34, was appointed to the position of Minister for External Affairs. Cosgrave took part in trade discussions and chaired the Committee of Ministers of the Council of Europe in 1955. He also presided over Ireland's admission to the United Nations in 1955. Cosgrave outlined the three principles of his foreign policy to the Dáil in June 1956: adherence to the principles of the UN Charter, independence and non-alignment, and "to do whatever we can as a member of the UN to preserve the Christian civilisation of which we are a part and with that end in view to support whenever possible those powers principally responsible for the defence of the free world in their resistance to the spread of communist power and influence". Ireland was non-aligned in favour of the United States. The second Inter Party government collapsed amid severely deflationary policies set by the Minister for Finance, Gerard Sweetman. Cosgrave held Sweetman personally responsible for Fine Gael's defeat at the 1957 general election, and told him so, reportedly stating that Fine Gael "was no longer led by people living in big houses at the end of long avenues." He did not speak to Sweetman for some years.

Opposition
Cosgrave remained active in opposition. He privately supported Fianna Fáil's referendum to abolish the system of proportional representation in June 1959, which was defeated. This opposition was to count against him later that year in the leadership contest. In October 1959, the dual leadership of Fine Gael, Mulcahy and Costello, stood down. Costello wanted to continue his practice as a senior counsel as well as being leader. He had asked Cosgrave to be his "managing director" in the Dáil while he was absent on legal work, which had declined to do. James Dillon and Cosgrave contested the leadership with Dillon decisively being elected as leader. With Fine Gael in opposition during the 1960s, an internal struggle for the policy direction of the party was beginning. A large body of members called on Fine Gael to move decisively towards social democracy. A set of eight principles known as the Just Society was put forward to the party leadership by Declan Costello, the son of John A. Costello. The principles called for higher state spending in health and social welfare with a greater state role in the economy. Despite his conservative credentials, Cosgrave adopted a somewhat positive attitude to the Just Society document. Fianna Fáil went on to win the 1965 general election and Fine Gael remained in opposition.

Fine Gael leader
 
In 1965, when James Dillon resigned as leader of Fine Gael after the 1965 general election loss, Liam Cosgrave easily won the leadership. He led his party to defeat in the 1969 election and was under constant threat and challenge by younger more social democratic elements represented by Garret FitzGerald who was elected to the Dáil in 1969. Cosgrave's erstwhile opponent, Declan Costello, had retired in 1969. Cosgrave's fortunes changed in 1970. He played a key role in the Arms Crisis, when, as Leader of the Opposition, he pressured then Fianna Fáil leader and Taoiseach, Jack Lynch, to take action against senior ministers who were involved in importing arms intended for the Provisional IRA. The information had been leaked to him by the Garda Special Branch, who had already informed the Taoiseach.

Cosgrave's determination to support government anti-terrorist legislation in votes in the Dáil, in the face of opposition from his party, almost cost him his leadership. The growing liberal wing in Fine Gael was opposing the Government's stringent laws on civil liberty grounds. Cosgrave put the security of the State and its institutions first. At the Fine Gael Ard Fheis in May 1972, Cosgrave faced down his political opponents. In a speech littered with references to Fine Gael's founding fathers, he contrasted the difficulties posed by the IRA in Northern Ireland with those faced by the first Free State government in dealing with the anti-treatyites. Departing from his script, Cosgrave rounded on his leadership rivals. Asking delegates if they did any hunting Cosgrave declared that "… some of these commentators and critics are now like mongrel foxes; they are gone to ground but I'll dig them out, and the pack will chop them when they get them". Though he was criticised for taking a "partionist" or unionist stance in his speech, Cosgrave led Fine Gael to office a year later. Cosgrave supported the government's Offences Against the State (Amendment) Bill in November 1972, despite the position taken by Fine Gael to oppose the Bill.

Taoiseach (1973–1977)

 
After the 1973 general election, Cosgrave led a coalition government of Fine Gael and the Labour Party, formed on 14 March. He adhered to the implementation of the Fourteen Point Plan on which the National Coalition was elected. Among the government ministers were future Taoiseach and writer Garret FitzGerald, former United Nations diplomat Conor Cruise O'Brien, television presenter and veterinary professor Justin Keating. Cosgrave balanced these with hardline Christian Democrats such as Richard Burke, former teacher Peter Barry and west Dublin farmer Mark Clinton. He appointed Richie Ryan rather than Garret FitzGerald as his Minister for Finance when the Labour Party leader, Brendan Corish, declined the position in 1973. Ryan, a Dublin solicitor, was of typically conservative Fine Gael stock. Nevertheless, Ryan (dubbed "Red Richie" by Fianna Fáil) implemented the Coalition's plans to replace death duties with a range of capital taxes, including Capital Gains Tax and Wealth Tax. Fianna Fáil strongly opposed these new capital taxes and garnered considerable support from the wealthy and propertied classes as a result that would stand them in good stead in future elections.

The world energy crisis triggered by the Yom Kippur War in October 1973, which caused inflationary problems, constrained the coalition fiscally.

Contraception
In December 1973, the Supreme Court declared the ban on the importation of contraceptives by married persons to be unconstitutional. Patrick Cooney, the Minister for Justice, introduced legislation in 1974 to regulate and allow for married couples to obtain contraceptives. Fianna Fáil opposed any liberalisation of the law on family planning and opposed the bill in the Dáil on grounds of protection of public morality and health. In line with his conservative credentials, and on a free vote, Cosgrave, without warning, crossed the floor to help defeat the bill in the summer of 1974.

Clashes with the Presidency
The coalition suffered an early electoral defeat in the 1973 presidential election, when Fine Gael candidate Tom O'Higgins was defeated by the Fianna Fáil candidate, Erskine H. Childers. Childers had sought the presidency with promises of making the office more open and hands-on, in particular with plans to create a think tank within Áras an Uachtaráin to develop an outline for Ireland's future. Cosgrave refused to allow it, and frustrated Childers' plans to break with the restrained precedent of his office.

Childers died suddenly in November 1974. His successor Cearbhall Ó Dálaigh, a former Chief Justice of Ireland and former Attorney General of Ireland, was an agreed candidate in an unopposed election. Ó Dálaigh was identified with Fianna Fáil. Ó Dálaigh was also a noted critic of the curtailment of free speech and was highly critical of the introduction of Section 31 of the Broadcasting Act, which forbade the broadcast of the voices of Sinn Féin members. This put him at odds with Cosgrave, whose government had strengthened the Act. Cosgrave also briefed President Ó Dálaigh only once every six months, which was, in the President's opinion, too infrequently as well as too inadequately. In addition, Cosgrave frequently interfered in Ó Dálaigh's constitutional role as the state's representative to foreign governments; he was not permitted to receive the Legion of Honour from France, although former president Seán T. O'Kelly had previously received it, and Cosgrave attended the United States' bicentennial celebrations in 1976 in Ó Dálaigh's place.

The government had introduced the Emergency Powers Bill following the assassination in July of the British Ambassador to Ireland, Christopher Ewart-Biggs, by the IRA; it had passed the Dáil on 21 September. After consultation with the Council of State, Ó Dálaigh exercised his power to refer the Bill to the Supreme Court two days later to test its constitutionality, bringing him into more direct conflict with the government. Although the Court ruled that the Bill was constitutional, and Ó Dálaigh signed the Bill into law on 16 October, an IRA action on the same day in Mountmellick resulted in the death of a member of Garda Michael Clerkin. Cosgrave's government, already infuriated, blamed Ó Dálaigh's delaying enactment of the bill for Clerkin's murder. On 18 October Minister for Defence Paddy Donegan attacked the President for sending the bill to the Supreme Court, calling him a "thundering disgrace".

Cosgrave called Ó Dálaigh to inform him of Donegan's speech, but refused to meet with him in person to discuss the matter, partly due to his dislike for Ó Dálaigh's Fianna Fail links and perceived pretensions, fuelling the president's anger. He refused to receive Donegan when he came to personally apologise. When Cosgrave then refused to accept Donegan's resignation, this proved the last straw for Ó Dálaigh, who resigned on 22 October 1976 "to protect the dignity and independence of the presidency as an institution".

Northern Ireland
The Government signed the Sunningdale Agreement in December 1973, an attempt to resolve political troubles in Northern Ireland. A powersharing executive was set up and a Council of Ireland was to be established. The institutions established under the Agreement collapsed in May 1974 as a consequence of the Ulster Workers' Council Strike. In addition many Republican voters were angered by what they saw as Cosgrave's harsh line on the Provisional IRA and the handling of the Dublin and Monaghan Bombings.

The 2003 Barron report on the Dublin and Monaghan bombings noted that the Fine Gael/Labour government of the time "showed little interest in the bombings" and did not do enough to help the investigation. "When information was given to them suggesting that the British authorities had intelligence naming the bombers, this was not followed up". It failed to put political pressure on the British government to secure better co-operation from the RUC. It was also alleged that the Fine Gael/Labour government caused or allowed the Garda investigation to end prematurely, for fear that the findings would play into the hands of republicans. However, the Inquiry had insufficient evidence the investigation was stopped as a result of political interference.

Both The Irish Times and the Irish Press, which was edited by Tim Pat Coogan, were extremely critical of the government's curtailment of freedom of speech and in particular of the Minister for Posts and Telegraphs, Conor Cruise O'Brien which was used against the IRA. Coogan declared what he dubbed "editorial war" on the government after a, now notorious, interview between Bernard Nossiter of The Washington Post and O'Brien in August 1976 regarding the passage of the Emergency Powers Bill. During the course of the interview O'Brien stated that he would've liked the bill to be used against teachers who glorified Irish revolutionaries and against newspaper editors who published letters in support of Republicans. The coalition attempted to prosecute The Irish Press for its coverage of the maltreatment of republican prisoners by the Garda "Heavy Gang", with the paper winning the case. Cosgrave was accused of taking an anti-republican or pro-unionist line on Northern Ireland.

Economic measures
The Cosgrave government's tough austerity measures alienated the public. Finance Minister Richie Ryan was nicknamed 'Richie Ruin' on a satirical TV programme, Hall's Pictorial Weekly. Marginal income tax rates came to 77% one year. The electorate had not experienced unemployment and hardship of this nature since the fifties and the Government became quite unpopular. The hard line approach to law and order, the economic difficulties were quite damaging to Cosgrave and Corish's popularity.

Welfare measures
In the field of social security, a number of important reforms in welfare provision were introduced during Cosgrave's premiership. In 1974, sickness insurance, unemployment insurance, and occupational injuries coverage were extended to all employees, while earnings-related components were added to the basic flat-rate sickness benefit, the basic flat-rate short-term occupational injury benefit, and the basic flat-rate unemployment benefit. That same year, pension insurance was extended to all employees, and a means-tested allowance for the wives of prisoners was introduced.

"Blow-Ins": 1977 election
In May 1977, Cosgrave addressed a Fine Gael Ard Fheis on the eve of the general election. He made a strong attack on "blow-ins" who could "blow out or blow up". This was taken to be an attack either on Kader Asmal, founder of the Irish Anti Apartheid Movement and the Irish Council for Civil Liberties, or on Bruce Arnold, the British-born political writer in the Irish Independent newspaper who had been vociferously opposed to Cosgrave's policies, particularly regarding the President and the wealth tax. While the Fine Gael grassroots loved it, it backfired politically.

James Tully, the Labour Minister for Local Government had redrawn the constituency boundaries (the "Tullymander") and had expected that the new boundaries would favour the two government parties. Dublin, apart from Dún Laoghaire, was divided into some 13 three seat constituencies where Fine Gael and Labour were to take one seat each reducing Fianna Fáil to a minority rump in the capital. The election campaign started without Cosgrave taking any opinion polls in advance, and was therefore unaware of the extent of Fianna Fáil's support. During the campaign, the National Coalition made up some ground but the Fianna Fáil manifesto of promises (including the abolition of rates, and the car tax) was proved very popular in the electorate and the National Coalition was heavily defeated, with Fianna Fáil winning an unprecedentedly large parliamentary majority, including unexpected second seats in many Dublin constituencies.

In the immediate aftermath, Liam Cosgrave resigned as Fine Gael leader, to be succeeded by his Garret FitzGerald. Cosgrave retired at the 1981 general election.

Post-Taoiseach
In 1981, Cosgrave retired as Dáil Deputy for Dún Laoghaire to be replaced by his son, Liam T. Cosgrave. He reduced his involvement in public life but he made occasional appearances and speeches; in October 2010 he attended the launch of The Reluctant Taoiseach, a book about former Taoiseach John A. Costello written by David McCullagh. He also appeared in public for the Centenary of the Easter Rising in 2016, watching on from a car as the military parade marched through Dublin. On 8 May 2016, in a joint appearance with the grandsons of Éamonn Ceannt and Cathal Brugha, he unveiled a plaque commemorating the 1916 Rising at St. James's Hospital, the former site of the South Dublin Union.

He received an annual pension payment of €133,082. He lived in Knocklyon.

Family
His wife, Vera Cosgrave, died on 15 September 2016, aged 90. His son, Liam T. Cosgrave, is a former politician.

Death
Cosgrave died on 4 October 2017 at the age of 97 of natural causes. He had been at Tallaght Hospital for several months prior to his death there.

Taoiseach Leo Varadkar said "Liam Cosgrave was someone who devoted his life to public service; a grateful country thanks and honours him for that and for always putting the nation first. Throughout his life he worked to protect and defend the democratic institutions of our State, and showed great courage and determination in doing so. He always believed in peaceful co-operation as the only way of achieving a genuine union between the people on this island, and in the 1970s he celebrated that this country had embarked, in his own words, ‘on a new career of progress and development in the context of Europe’. I had the honour on a few occasions to meet and be in the presence of Liam Cosgrave, and I was always struck by his commanding presence and great humility, which in him were complementary characteristics." His funeral was held on 7 October 2017, after which he was interred alongside his father at Inchicore's Goldenbridge Cemetery.

See also
Families in the Oireachtas

References

 

-

1920 births
2017 deaths
Children of Taoisigh
Liam
Fine Gael TDs
Leaders of Fine Gael
Knights Grand Cross of the Order of Pope Pius IX
Members of the 11th Dáil
Members of the 12th Dáil
Members of the 13th Dáil
Members of the 14th Dáil
Members of the 15th Dáil
Members of the 16th Dáil
Members of the 17th Dáil
Members of the 18th Dáil
Members of the 19th Dáil
Members of the 20th Dáil
Members of the 21st Dáil
Ministers for Foreign Affairs (Ireland)
Parliamentary Secretaries of the 13th Dáil
People educated at Castleknock College
People educated at Synge Street CBS
Politicians from Dublin (city)
People from South Dublin (county)
People from Dún Laoghaire
People from Templeogue
Presidents of the European Council
Taoisigh
Government Chief Whip (Ireland)
Alumni of King's Inns
Burials at Goldenbridge Cemetery